Thalassictis is an extinct genus of terrestrial carnivore in the family Hyaenidae that lived in Asia during the Middle to Late Miocene and in Europe and North Africa during the Late Miocene.

Discovery
 
Thalassictis was named by Nordmann (1850) [in Gervais ]. Its type is Thalassictis robusta. It was assigned to Hyaenidae by Kurtén (1982) and Flynn (1998).

References

Miocene feliforms
Miocene genus extinctions
Miocene mammals of Europe
Miocene mammals of Africa
Miocene mammals of Asia
Prehistoric hyenas
Prehistoric carnivoran genera